Upper Albert Road is a road on the Government Hill in the Central area of Hong Kong. 

The road was named after Prince Albert of Saxe-Coburg and Gotha, the consort of Queen Victoria.

Surrounding Government House, the residence of former Governors of Hong Kong and present Chief Executive of Hong Kong, the road is used as a destination for various protests which sometimes results in traffic congestion, and as such Upper Albert Road is used as a synonym of the Chief Executive's Office.

The road is irregularly U-shaped and almost encircles Government House. Starting from Lower Albert Road, the road winds up the hills and turns near the Consulate General of United States of America building.  It intersects with Garden Road, Kennedy Road and Cotton Tree Drive.

On the upper part of the road, its north side is covered by the Hong Kong Zoological and Botanical Gardens and ends in the junction with Caine Road, Glenealy and Arbuthnot Road near the headquarters of Caritas Hong Kong.

As it forms part of the early development of the city of Victoria, some old curtain fig trees stand beside the road.

See also
 List of streets and roads in Hong Kong

References

External links 
 
 List of old and valuable tree
 Network of tunnels for air raids. (in Chinese)
Google Maps of Upper Albert Road

Central, Hong Kong
Government Hill
Roads on Hong Kong Island